The First Presbyterian Church is a historic church at 471 Main Street in Highlands, North Carolina.  The single story wood-frame church was built in 1883–85, and occupies a prominent site in downtown Highlands, surrounded by a period picket fence.  It is the oldest church in the city, and was built by Marion Wright, a local master builder.  It is stylistically a vernacular interpretation of Italianate architecture, which is most prominent in its belfry tower, which features a flared roof with extended bracketed eaves.

The building was listed on the National Register of Historic Places in 1996.

See also
National Register of Historic Places listings in Macon County, North Carolina

References

Presbyterian churches in North Carolina
Churches on the National Register of Historic Places in North Carolina
Italianate architecture in North Carolina
Churches completed in 1885
19th-century Presbyterian church buildings in the United States
Churches in Macon County, North Carolina
National Register of Historic Places in Macon County, North Carolina
Italianate church buildings in the United States